The finger bun is a fruit bun popular in the United Kingdom, Australia, particularly in South Australia and Victoria, and New Zealand. At one time it was a bakery and school staple but its popularity has waned. 
It has been used to help promote awareness of breast cancer. 

They are also popular in the United Kingdom where, unlike in Australia, they are eaten unbuttered.

See also
 List of buns

References

External links
Bakers Delight Australian website

Bread dishes
Australian breads
Australian cuisine
New Zealand breads
British breads